metro station is on the Green line of the Stockholm metro, located in Enskedefältet, Söderort. The station was inaugurated on 1 October 1930 as part of the stretch between Gullmarsplan and Stureby.

A southerly extension of the Blue line of the Stockholm metro is currently under construction and expected to be opened for the passengers in 2030. As part of this development, the Blue line will take over this station.

References

External links
Images of Sockenplan station

Green line (Stockholm metro) stations
Railway stations opened in 1930